Bungaree was an Aboriginal Australian explorer, entertainer and diplomat who died in 1830.

The name Bungaree may also refer to:

Places
Bungaree, South Australia
Bungaree, Tasmania
Bungaree, Victoria

Other
HMAS Bungaree
Bungaree, a ship of the Blue Anchor Line, which operated to Australia between 1889 and 1902.
Bungaree, an Emerald-class ferry
Bungaree Primary School - Rockingham Western Australia

People
Bungaree, real name John Gorrick, Australian bare-knuckle boxer from the 19th century